Closed for the Season is a book written by Mary Downing Hahn and published by Clarion Books (now owned by Houghton Mifflin Harcourt) on 15 June 2009 which later went on to win the Edgar Award for Best Juvenile in 2010.

References 

Edgar Award-winning works
American mystery novels
2008 American novels
Clarion Books books